Pavel Dochev (born 28 September 1965) is a Bulgarian retired football defender, who last managed Erzgebirge Aue. Since his retirement from professional football in 2002, he has managed several football teams, mostly in Germany.

Managerial career
Before being appointed as the new manager of Hansa Rostock, he previously managed Erzgebirge Aue, with whom he finished second in the 2015–16 3. Liga season, thus gaining direct return to the 2. Bundesliga after just one season. During the same season, he won the regional cup of Saxony.

Managerial statistics

References

External links

1965 births
Living people
Bulgarian footballers
Bulgaria youth international footballers
Bulgarian football managers
Bulgarian expatriate football managers
FC Lokomotiv 1929 Sofia players
PFC CSKA Sofia players
Hamburger SV players
Holstein Kiel players
SC Paderborn 07 players
First Professional Football League (Bulgaria) players
Bundesliga players
FC Rot-Weiß Erfurt managers
FC Erzgebirge Aue managers
Bulgarian expatriate sportspeople in Germany
SC Preußen Münster managers
PFC CSKA Sofia managers
SV Sandhausen managers
Footballers from Sofia
Expatriate football managers in Germany
SC Paderborn 07 managers
2. Bundesliga managers
3. Liga managers
FC Hansa Rostock managers
FC Viktoria Köln managers
MSV Duisburg managers
Association football defenders
Bulgarian expatriate footballers
Bulgaria international footballers